Malaspina can refer to:

People
The Italian noble Malaspina family. Members of this family include:
Albert Malaspina (1160/65 – 1206/12), Italian marquess.
Conrad Malaspina (The Old) ( – after 1254), Italian nobleman.
 Spinetta Malaspina, Italian nobleman.
 Opizzo Malaspina (late 11th century – 1254 ), Italian nobleman.
 Spinetta II Malaspina, Italian nobleman.
Conrad Malaspina (The Young), Italian nobleman
Ricciarda Malaspina (1497–1553), 16th-century Italian marchesa.
Taddea Malaspina (1505 – after 1537), 16th-century Italian marchesa.
Alessandro Malaspina (1754–1810), Spanish-Italian explorer.
Michele Malaspina (1908–79), Italian actor and voice actor.
Oliviero Malaspina (1961), Italian poet and musician. 
 
Places and objects, mostly named after Alessandro Malaspina
Malaspina Glacier, Alaska.
Malaspina Inlet, British Columbia.
Malaspina Peninsula, British Columbia.
Malaspina Strait, British Columbia.
Malaspina Provincial Park, British Columbia.
Vancouver Island University, British Columbia, was formerly Malaspina University-College, and before that was Malaspina College.
M/V Malaspina, Alaskan ferry.
, a settlement in the Chubut Province of Argentina.

Other
 Malaspina (film), a 1947 Italian film directed by Armando Fizzarotti.